Domestic material consumption is a measurement of the total amount of material directly used in an economy, excluding hidden flows. DMC equals DMI minus exports (in economy wide material flow accounting).

References

External links
Definitions:
 Glossary:Domestic material consumption (DMC) - Statistics Explained, ec.europa.eu
 Materials - Material consumption, data.oecd.org
 Material consumption | Materials, oecd-ilibrary.org
 Domestic Material Consumption (DMC), un.org

Charts:
 Domestic material consumption per capita, 2019,  ourworldindata.org
 8.4.2 Domestic material consumption, domestic material consumption per capita, and domestic material consumption per GDP, wesr.unep.org

Macroeconomic indicators